St Peter's Hospital is a health facility in Spital Road, Maldon, Essex. It is managed by Mid and South Essex NHS Foundation Trust.

History
The facility has it origins in the Maldon Union Workhouse which was designed by Frederick Peck in the Tudor style and opened in 1873. It became the Maldon Institution in 1930 and joined the National Health Service as St Peter's Hospital in 1948. Improvement works were carried out in November 2018.

References

External links 
 
 St Peter's Hospital on the NHS website
 Inspection reports from the Care Quality Commission

Hospital buildings completed in 1873
Hospitals established in 1873
Hospitals in Essex
NHS hospitals in England
1873 establishments in England